Seattle Sounders FC is a soccer team based in Seattle, Washington, that competes in Major League Soccer (MLS), the most senior soccer league in the United States. The club was established in 2007 as an MLS expansion team, succeeding an existing second-division team, and began play in 2009. The MLS regular season typically runs from February to October and the best-performing team is awarded the Supporters' Shield; the top nine teams from each conference qualify for the MLS Cup Playoffs, a postseason tournament that culminates in the MLS Cup.

In addition to league play, the Sounders compete in the annual U.S. Open Cup tournament organized by the United States Soccer Federation and the Leagues Cup contested by teams from MLS and Liga MX of Mexico. The league and cup tournaments serve as qualifiers for the following year's CONCACAF Champions League, an annual international competition between league and cup champions in North America, Central America, and the Caribbean. The CONCACAF Champions League winner then qualifies for the next FIFA Club World Cup, which is held annually but will switch to every four years beginning in 2025.

Seattle are one of the most successful clubs in MLS history, having won eight trophies since entering the league in 2009. They won three consecutive U.S. Open Cup titles from 2009 to 2011 and a fourth in 2014, becoming the second MLS club to do so. The club earned their first Supporters' Shield in 2014, completing a double, and won the MLS Cup in 2016 and 2019 during a run of four finals in five years. They won their first CONCACAF Champions League in 2022, becoming the first MLS club to win the competition under its modern format and qualify for the FIFA Club World Cup. Sigi Schmid was the club's head coach from the inaugural MLS season in 2009 until July 2016; he was replaced by Brian Schmetzer, initially as interim coach and later as full head coach. Colombian striker Fredy Montero is the club's all-time top scorer with 76 goals; he joined the club in 2009 and has played for Seattle in two stints.

As of the end of the 2022 season, the club has played 14 seasons in MLS with 211 wins, 141 losses, and 104 draws—a winning percentage of 0.577. The Sounders qualified for the MLS Cup Playoffs in their first 13 seasons—tied for the MLS record and the second longest among the major sports leagues in the United States behind the National Hockey League's Pittsburgh Penguins.  The Sounders led MLS attendance in their first eight years in the league, averaging over 30,000 per season, until they were surpassed by Atlanta United FC in 2017. The club achieved their highest season attendance in 2015 with 44,247 per match; as of 2022, Seattle's 219 regular season matches at Lumen Field have averaged 39,053 spectators and totaled over 8.55 million. The most-attended home matches in Sounders were the 2022 CONCACAF Champions League Final's 2nd leg with 68,741—a tournament record—and MLS Cup 2019 with 69,274 spectators.

Key
Key to competitions

 Major League Soccer (MLS) – The top-flight of soccer in the United States, established in 1996.
 U.S. Open Cup (USOC) – The premier knockout cup competition in U.S. soccer, first contested in 1914 and open to all registered teams.
 Leagues Cup (LC) – An inter-league competition hosted by MLS teams against clubs from Liga MX in Mexico since 2020.
 CONCACAF Champions League (CCL) – The premier club competition in North American soccer since 1962. It was named the Champions' Cup until 2008.
 Campeones Cup (CC) – A super cup match between the winners of the MLS Cup and Mexico's Campeón de Campeones, established in 2018.
 MLS is Back Tournament (MiB) – A club tournament for MLS teams held once during the 2020 season, which had been disrupted by the COVID-19 pandemic.
 FIFA Club World Cup (CWC) – The premier intercontinental club tournament organized by FIFA since 2000 between the winners of continental competitions, such as CCL.

Key to colors and symbols

Key to league record
 Season = The year and article of the season
 Div = Division/level on pyramid
 League = League name
 Pld = Games played
 W = Games won
 L = Games lost
 D = Games drawn
 GF = Goals for
 GA = Goals against
 GD = Goal difference
 Pts = Points
 PPG = Points per game
 Conf. = Conference position
 Overall = League position

Key to cup record
 DNE = Did not enter
 DNQ = Did not qualify
 NH = Competition not held or canceled
 QR = Qualifying round
 PR = Preliminary round
 GS = Group stage
 R1 = First round
 R2 = Second round
 R3 = Third round
 R4 = Fourth round
 R5 = Fifth round
 Ro16 = Round of 16
 Ro32 = Round of 32
 QF = Quarterfinals or Conference Semifinals
 SF = Semifinals or Conference Finals
 F = Final
 RU = Runners-up
 W = Winners

Seasons

Notes

References

 
American soccer club seasons
seasons